Taurus Tomahawk, in rocketry is a two-stage sounding rocket, consisting of a Taurus first stage and a TE-416 Tomahawk upper stage. 

Taurus Tomahawks were used between 1978 and 1987. The Taurus Tomahawk could carry 60 lb of payload to an altitude of 365 miles. The launch thrust of the Taurus Tomahawk amounted to 82000 lb, the launch weight 3550 lb, the diameter of 23 inches and the overall length of 30.79 feet.

External links 

Taurus Tomahawk

Sounding rockets of the United States